The Shuvoyka, also known as Shuvoya (Шувоя) is a river in Moscow Oblast, Russia. It is a right tributary of the Guslitsa (Nerskaya's tributary). Source on northeast in 6 km from the city of Yegoryevsk. Flows all over West, Shuvoyka running into Guslitsa near the village of Ilyinsky Pogost.

The villages of Ryzhoye, Curbatikha, Shuvoye, Gridino, Ustyanovo, Yuryatino are situated on the Shuvoyka.

References 

 Russian: Вагнер Б. Б. Реки и озера Подмосковья. — М.: Вече, 2007. — С. 382–383. .

Rivers of Moscow Oblast